Roy Holger Berglöf (April 24, 1924 – July 27, 2017) was a Swedish curler.

He was a two-time Swedish men's curling champion (1968, 1971) and played for Sweden in two . He was also a 1970 Swedish mixed curling champion.

In 1972 he was inducted into the Swedish Curling Hall of Fame.

He was also a bandy player, winning a bronze medal at the 1957 Bandy World Championship.

Teams

Men's

Mixed

Personal life

References

External links
 

1924 births
2017 deaths
Sportspeople from Karlstad
Swedish male curlers
Swedish curling champions
Swedish bandy players